Daan may refer to:

People
Daan (given name), Dutch short form for Daniel
Saumya Daan (born 1982), Indian voice actor
Serge Daan (1940–2018), Dutch zoologist
 DAAN, a Belgian band led by Daan Stuyven
 Da'an, a character in the television series Earth: Final Conflict

Places

Mainland China 
 Da'an, Hengyang, a township in Hengyang County, Hunan
 Da'an, Longshan, a township in Longshan County, Hunan
 Da'an, Jilin, county-level city under the administration of Baicheng
 Da'an District, Zigong, Sichuan

Taiwan 
 Daan District, Taipei City, district of Taipei
 Daan metro station of the Taipei Metro
 Da'an River, river in north-western Taiwan
 Daan District, Taichung, coastal district in Taichung City

Elsewhere
 Da'an, Yemen, village in western central Yemen
 Daan Suyan, town on southern Mindanao, Philippines

Chinese history
Da'an (大安, 1075–1085), era name used by Emperor Huizong of Western Xia
Da'an (大安, 1085–1094), era name used by Emperor Daozong of Liao
Da'an (大安, 1209–1211), era name used by Wanyan Yongji, emperor of Jin dynasty

Other 
 Daan (crater), crater on Mars named after the Chinese city
 Daan Utsav, Indian festival
 Dāna, the practice of generosity or giving in Dharmic religions
 Dayan (disambiguation), a phonetically similar term